Gülçin Santırcıoğlu (born 1977) is a Turkish actress.

Biography
She was born in 1977 in İzmir. She took opera lessons at Dokuz Eylül University Conservatory School of Performing Arts. Aside from her acting career, she worked as a soloist for various bands and taught singing courses at Ruhi Su Culture and Arts Foundation. The first movie she appeared in was Türev. Released in 2005, it won the Best Film award at the Antalya Golden Orange Film Festival. With her role as Süreyya in this movie, she was awarded as the Most Promising Actress at the 13th ÇASOD Awards. Her breakthrough came through her role in the series Elveda Rumeli, in which she portrayed the character of Hatice. In 2007, she was cast alongside Nejat İşler, Saadet Aksoy and Ufuk Bayraktar in Yumurta, the first installment of a trilogy directed by Semih Kaplanoğlu which later won many national and international awards. In 2008, she shared the leading role with Kaan Keskin in the movie İki Çizgi, which was screened at 30 national and international film festivals, including the 65th Venice Film Festival and the 45th Antalya Golden Orange Film Festival. Santırcıoğlu then continued her career by appearing in various TV productions. In 2012, she voiced the song "Ala Gözlerini Sevdiğim Dilber" for Badem band's studio album Badem ve Konukları. In 2013, she was among the judging panel of the Rotterdam Golden Tulip Film Festival. In recent years, Santırcıoğlu has been mainly known for her roles in series such as Kara Ekmek, Oyunbozan and Hercai.

Filmography

Film

Television

Awards 
2006: 13th ÇASOD "Best Actors" Awards - Most Promising Actress (Türev)

References

External links 
 
 

1977 births
Turkish television actresses
Turkish film actresses
Actresses from İzmir
Living people